A Beckoning sign is a type of gesture intended to beckon or call-over someone or something. It is usually translated into "come here". This form of nonverbal communication varies from culture to culture, each having a relatively unique method of indicating invitation or enticement.

Around the world

United States
In the United States, the "beckoning finger" or the "beckoning palm" are the most common gestures implying beckoning. Both are accomplished by up-turning the palm, and extending and retracting either one or two fingers while keeping the rest clenched in a fist or by extending and retracting all of the fingers, all while keeping the palm upturned.

Japan
The American beckoning sign is considered an insult in Japan, signifying a dog or other animal. To beckon in Japan, the hand is placed at head-level, palm facing down, and waved back and forward with the fingers pointing toward the ground.

Philippines
In the Philippines, beckoning someone in the American fashion is regarded rude and fit only for dogs. It may also be punishable by arrest.

See also
Gesture
List of gestures

References

Gestures